Nurse on Wheels is a 1963 British comedy film directed by Gerald Thomas, and starring Juliet Mills, Ronald Lewis, and Joan Sims.

Nurse on Wheels shares its cast and production team with the Carry On films, but the film is not an official member of the Carry On series.

Story
Joanna Jones, a nurse, passes her driving test (after one hundred and six lessons) and successfully applies for a job as District Nurse.

She settles into a cottage with her mother, and goes about her work with quiet confidence. But she finds that the patients are used to, and prefer, an older nurse, like Nurse Merrick, who has recently retired.

Joanna despairs of winning the confidence of her patients, but is then visited by Nurse Merrick who tells her that it was the same when she arrived many years before. Boosted by this, Joanna soon wins the support of the populace.

She also meets Henry Edwards, a rich but very short-tempered farmer. Her mother hopes that Joanna will fall in love with Dr Golfrey, who Joanna works with, but in fact it is Edwards who shows more interest in her.

When a young couple, Ann and Tim Taylor, park their caravan in one of the fields owned by Edwards, the population rally around a heavily pregnant Mrs Taylor. Edwards tries to evict them, but Joanna has taken charge of the delivery, and won't allow it.

All works out in the end. Dr Golfrey offers the vacant receptionist's job to Deborah, daughter of the local vicar (who is smitten with him anyway). Joanna becomes engaged to Edwards, who promises to curb his temper. And Mr Taylor is offered a job as gardener at the vicarage.

Cast

Background
The action was filmed partially in Little Missenden, Buckinghamshire. 
It was based on the story 'Nurse is my Neighbour' by Joanna Jones, pseudonym of John Burke.

Joan Sims was originally going to play Joanna Jones but apparently lost the role as she had gained weight prior to the production.

There seems to mismatch of reels as halfway through the film the story seems to go awry.

External links
 

1963 films
British comedy films
1963 comedy films
Films directed by Gerald Thomas
Films shot at Pinewood Studios
Films produced by Peter Rogers
Films with screenplays by Norman Hudis
1960s English-language films
1960s British films